Josef Berne (January 19, 1904 – December 19, 1964) was a Russian-born American writer, film director and producer. Berne was born Josef Berstein on January 19, 1904, in Kyiv, Russia (now Ukraine). He also wrote and directed Yiddish language dramas.

He directed 32 films between 1933 and 1950, most of which were short films.

He died on December 19, 1964, aged 60 in Palm Springs, California.

Selected filmography
 La vida bohemia (1938)
 Mirele Efros (1939) an adaptation of Yiddish play by Jacob Gordin of the same name
 Jam Session (1942)
 Turkey in the Straw (1942), short film starring Freddie Fisher
 Heavenly Music (1943) won Academy Award for Best Short Subject
 Lucky Cowboy (1944)
 They Live in Fear (1944) 
 Down Missouri Way (1946)

References

External links

1904 births
1964 deaths
American film directors